Antonio del Real is a Spanish film director, actor and screenwriter.

Partial filmography

Director
 Cha-cha-chá (1998)
 Mujer de mi vida, La (2001)
 Trileros (2003)
 Desde que amanece apetece (2005)
 La Conjura de El Escorial (2008)

Actor
 The Cannibal Man (1972)
 No One Heard the Scream (1973)
 Forget the Drums (1975)
 The Legion Like Women'' (1976)

References

External links

Spanish male film actors
1947 births
Living people